Ražnatović is an ethnic Montenegrin Orthodox surname with origin in the Ceklin clan of Montenegro, in the villages of Rijeka Crnojevića, Dujeva, Šinđon, Prevlaka, Drušići, Dodoši. This surname can only be of Montenegrin ethnicity, since they are so many of them living abroad.
The earliest information on the last name Ražnatović dates back to the 14th century. They were considered to be one of the very few families who had been in Rijeka Crnojevića since its inception. Since the formation of Old Montenegro, they were many brave warriors and heroes with this last name.

Notables
Željko Ražnatović Arkan (1952–2000), Serbian warlord of Montenegrin origin.
Svetlana Ražnatović (born 1973), Serbian singer and wife of Željko Ražnatović Arkan
 Miško Ražnatović (born 1966), Serbian lawyer and sports agent of Montenegrin origin.

Serbian surnames